Damian Lau Chung-yan (born 14 October 1949) is a Hong Kong film and television actor, executive producer and film director. Lau has starred in many television drama series of various genres, produced by Hong Kong's TVB and ATV.

Biography

Early career
Lau enrolled into the actors' training class of RTV (now ATV) in 1971, where he started his early acting career. In 1976, he joined TVB on a contract and began to gain recognition for acting in television drama series produced by the TV station. In 1976, Lau rose to fame for his portrayal of the titular character in Luk Siu-fung, an adaptation of Wuxia writer Gu Long's novel series of the same title. His performance in Yesterday's Glitter also made him famous.

Partnership with Michelle Yim
Lau returned to ATV in 1980. He worked with Michelle Yim, as the male and female leading actor/actress respectively, in a number of TV series in the 1980s, including Fatherland, Chronicles of the Shadow Swordsman and Rise of the Great Wall.

Film career
Following the rise in popularity of Hong Kong cinema in the 1980s and 1990s, Lau also started working on films in addition to television series. He was often cast as a typical silent, handsome, heroic swordsman in many Wuxia films of the 1980s and 1990s. One of his first major roles was in John Woo's Last Hurrah for Chivalry (1979), in which he played an assassin. In Duel to the Death, Lau's character faced Norman Chui‘s character in a final duel, said to be one of the best sword duels ever in Wuxia film history.

In 2006, Lau starred in The Tokyo Trial, a highly controversial film that was nominated at the Cannes Film Festival and won the 2007 Golden Rooster Awards for Best Screenplay. In the film, Lau played the historic judge Mei Ju-ao, who was able to convince ten other national judges to prosecute Japanese war criminals for their crimes against peace and humanity. The film also saw Lau delivering most of his lines in English for the first time in his acting career.

When interviewed about his role as Mei Ju-ao, Lau said,
"Mei Ju-ao is a person with a strong sense of ethics and national pride. He represented his country at a significant international affair. He had to shoulder great responsibility as well as a lot of pressure. If he did not harbor strong emotions and a patriotic heart within his bosom, he could hardly successfully overcome the many difficulties before him and fulfill the mission given by the country. He was cool-headed and witty throughout the trial. I tried to master his inner world through these aspects. I really respect him."

Return to TVB
Lau returned to TVB in 1992 and achieved success for his performance in The Greed of Man, in which he played an honest and cultured leader of the Hong Kong Stock Exchange, who was later murdered by his childhood friend, Ting Hai (played by Adam Cheng), over a love rivalry.

In 2003, Lau starred as Chow Ming-hin in the family drama Point of No Return. The following year, Lau worked on Hard Fate, a controversial TV series that received many complaints from viewers for its suicide scenes. In the series, Lau played Leung Pak-yin, an originally morally upright and ambitious company boss who became a desperate, deranged and almost insane man after experiencing many fateful incidents. In 2007, Lau played a family patriarch in The Drive of Life, a 60 episodes grand production by TVB and mainland China's CCTV.

Personal life
In the 1990s, Lau married a flight attendant from Cathay Pacific, whom he met earlier on a flight to Canada. Lau is also a devout Catholic.

Filmography

Films

Television series

MediaCorp TV Channel 8 series

Major Achievements

References

External links

Damian Lau Chung Yan's official website
Damian Lau in HK Cinemagic

|-
! colspan="3" style="background: #DAA520;" | Power Academy Awards
|-

1949 births
Living people
Chinese Roman Catholics
TVB actors
Hong Kong male film actors
20th-century Hong Kong male actors
21st-century Hong Kong male actors
Hong Kong male television actors